Robert Wemyss (born 1 July 1928) is an Australian former soccer player.

Playing career

Club career
Wemyss played for Polonia SC in the Victorian State League from 1956 to 1959. Wemyss was a joint winner of the Argus Medal in 1956, the Victorian Division 1 player of the year award.

Biography
Wemyss was born in Scotland. He was a member of the Australia squad at the 1956 Summer Olympics, but did not make his debut for the national team until 1958. Wemyss played his only two matches for Australia in 1958, both against New Zealand.

References

External links
 

1928 births
Living people
Australian soccer players
Footballers at the 1956 Summer Olympics
Olympic soccer players of Australia
Association football midfielders
Australia international soccer players
Scottish emigrants to Australia
Western Eagles FC players